The Maly Chembar is a river of Penza Oblast, Russia. It joins the Chembar near the town Belinsky.

References

Rivers of Penza Oblast